Morné Nagel (born 23 February 1978) is a South African sprinter. Together with Corné du Plessis, Lee-Roy Newton and Mathew Quinn he won a gold medal in 4 x 100 metres relay at the 2001 World Championships in Athletics.

Following the ruling of 13 December 2005 which retroactively disqualified Tim Montgomery and henceforth the American team, the South African team were promoted to gold medallists. Morne Nagel is tied for being the second fastest man in African history with his 6.48 60 meter dash, behind Leonard Myles-Mills' 6.45. He was ranked the fastest 60 meter in the world in 2002 according to the IAAF.

After a successful career Morne shifted his focus to coaching. This includes athletics, strength & conditioning and sport specific performance.

He is affiliated with the athletics & sport science program of the University of Johannesburg. Morne is also the managing director for SCF-Nutrition Pty Ltd. www.scfnutrition.com

Personal bests
60 metres – 6.48 (2002) NATIONAL RECORD 
100 metres – 10.13 (2002, 2003)
200 metres – 20.11 (2003) NATIONAL RECORD
300 metres – 32.14 (2006) NATIONAL RECORD 
400 metres – 46.92 (2008)

External links

South African male sprinters
1978 births
Living people
University of Pretoria alumni
World Athletics Championships medalists
World Athletics Championships athletes for South Africa
African Games silver medalists for South Africa
African Games medalists in athletics (track and field)
Athletes (track and field) at the 1999 All-Africa Games
Athletes (track and field) at the 2007 All-Africa Games
World Athletics Championships winners
Universiade medalists in athletics (track and field)
Universiade silver medalists for South Africa
Medalists at the 1999 Summer Universiade
20th-century South African people
21st-century South African people